Riptide was an Australian adventure television series, starring Ty Hardin, which was first broadcast in 1969. The show featured a foreign lead actor and a foreign producer, similar in approach to the later series The Outsiders. Co-stars were Jonathan Sweet and Sue Costin, while guest roles featured Australian actors such as Tony Ward, Rowena Wallace, Michael Pate, Bill Hunter, Helen Morse, John Meillon, Norman Yemm, Chips Rafferty, and Jack Thompson. The series was filmed at Australian locations.

Plot
The protagonist Moss Andrews (played by Ty Hardin, who had previously appeared in Bronco) is a once successful US-American businessman who took a sabbatical after his wife had died prematurely. The widower undertook a long sailing trip, hoping that experiencing pure nature would give him some peace of mind. In Australia, the beautiful environment helped him to pull himself together again and therefore he has decided to stay for the time being, operating a charter boat company along the eastern seaboard. However, he is frequently bothered by suspicious characters who try to follow through on hidden schemes. He always manages eventually to put paid to all looming menaces.

Production
The show was announced in 1966 as Charter Boat.

The series was filmed in colour. Ty Hardin said: "We can make a Riptide episode here for $70,000. In the States it would cost $200,000." However, the reception of the series did not meet the expectations of its producers. US-American broadcasters rejected the series and the enthusiasm of audiences in Australia and Europe was merely lukewarm. There was no second season for this TV show.

References

External links

Seven Network original programming
1969 Australian television series debuts
1969 Australian television series endings
Black-and-white Australian television shows